Glaucopsyche, commonly called blues, is a Holarctic genus of butterfly in the family Lycaenidae, found mainly in Palearctic Asia. For other species called "blues" see subfamily Polyommatinae and genus Plebejus.

SpeciesLepIndex: synonymic list for superfamily Papilionoidea family Lycaenidae; subfamily Polyommatinae
 Glaucopsyche alexis (Poda, 1761) – green-underside blue
 Glaucopsyche alluaudi Oberthür, 1922 Morocco may be Glaucopsyche melanops subspecies alluaudi
 Glaucopsyche argali (Elwes, 1899) 
Glaucopsyche argali argali southeast Altai
Glaucopsyche argali arkhar (Lukhtanov, 1990) Altai
 Glaucopsyche arizonensis McDunnough, 1936 Arizona may be Glaucopsyche lygdamus subspecies arizonensis
 Glaucopsyche astraea (Freyer, 1852) Asia Minor, Kurdistan
 Glaucopsyche charybdis (Staudinger, 1886) Central Asia
 Glaucopsyche damaetas (Denis & Schiffermüller, 1775)  T.L. "neighbourhood of Vienna"
 Glaucopsyche exerces (Boisduval, 1852)
 Glaucopsyche grumi (Forster, 1938)
 Glaucopsyche iphicles (Staudinger, 1886)
 Glaucopsyche kurnakovi (Kurentzov, 1970) Kamchatka
 Glaucopsyche laetifica (Püngeler, 1898) Kazakhstan
 Glaucopsyche lycormas (Butler, 1866) Siberia, Mongolia, China, Korea and Japan
 Glaucopsyche lycormas lycormas Japan
 Glaucopsyche lycormas scylla (Oberthür, 1880) Amur Oblast, Ussuri
 Glaucopsyche lycormas tomariana (Matsumura, 1928) Kunashir
 Glaucopsyche lygdamus (Doubleday, 1842) – silvery blue – North America
 Glaucopsyche lygdamus incognita (Tilden, 1974) – Behr's blue – California
 Glaucopsyche lygdamus palosverdesensis – Palos Verdes blue – California
 Glaucopsyche lygdamus afra (Edwards, 1883)
 Glaucopsyche lygdamus arizonensis McDunnough, 1936 Arizona
 Glaucopsyche lygdamus columbia (Skinner, 1917)
 Glaucopsyche lygdamus couperi Grote, 1874
 Glaucopsyche lygdamus jacki Stallings & Turner, 1947
 Glaucopsyche lygdamus maritima (Weeks, 1902) Baja California
 Glaucopsyche lygdamus mildredi Chermock, 1944
 Glaucopsyche lygdamus orcus (Edwards, 1869) California
 Glaucopsyche lygdamus oro Scudder, 1876
 Glaucopsyche melanops (Boisduval, 1829) – black-eyed blue
 Glaucopsyche melanops algirica (Heyne, 1895) North Africa and South Spain
 Glaucopsyche melanops alluaudi (Oberthür, 1922) Morocco
 Glaucopsyche mertila (Edwards, 1866)
 Glaucopsyche paphos Chapman, 1920 – Paphos blue (endemic to Cyprus) may be Glaucopsyche melanops subspecies paphos 
 Glaucopsyche pauper (Verity, 1919)
 Glaucopsyche piasus (Boisduval, 1852) – arrowhead blue – western North America
 Glaucopsyche piasus daunia (Edwards, 1871)
 Glaucopsyche piasus nevada Brown, 1975 Nevada
 Glaucopsyche piasus sagittigera (C. & R. Felder, 1865) California
 Glaucopsyche piasus toxeuma Brown, 1971
 Glaucopsyche piasus umbrosa Emmel, Emmel & Mattoon, 1998 California
 Glaucopsyche seminigra Howarth & Povolny, 1976 Iran and Afghanistan
 Glaucopsyche seminigra seminigra
 Glaucopsyche seminigra sofidensis Blom, 1979
 †Glaucopsyche xerces (Boisduval, 1852) – Xerces blue (extinct) San Francisco, United States

References

External links
Images representing Glaucopsyche  at Consortium for the Barcode of Life

 
Lycaenidae genera